National Route 3 (officially, PY03, better known as Ruta Tres) is a highway in Paraguay, which runs from Asunción to the border city of Salto del Guairá, the capital of the Canindeyú Department. It crosses the Capital District and 4 departments. It has many junctions with other national routes.

Distances, cities and towns

The following table shows the distances traversed by PY03 in each different department, showing cities and towns that it passes by (or near).

3